Christian Emil Krag-Juel-Vind-Frijs (8 December 1817 – 12 October 1896) was a Danish nobleman and politician. He was Council President of Denmark from 1865 to 1870 as the leader of the Frijs Cabinet.

Biography
Frijs graduated from Sorø Academy in 1835, thereby achieving his studentereksamen. He went on to study law, graduating cand.jur. in 1842.

Being the wealthiest large squire of Denmark and personally honoured by his peasants Frijs played a role in politics from the 1850s. During the internal debate about a new constitution after the 1864-war he was appointed prime minister in 1865 inaugurating the rule of the conservative party Højre that lasted until 1901 His cabinet was expected to widen the influence also of the farmers disappointed by the issuing of the conservative 1866-constitution but was besides marked by a beginning reclaiming of the moors and by railroad-founding. After his retreat in 1870 he led the negotiations with the French preventing a Danish participation in the Franco-Prussian War. He left politics 1880.

His son Count Mogens Krag-Juel-Vind-Frijs (1849–1923) was an outstanding liberal-conservative politician whose work anticipated the making of the modern conservative party.

See also
Frijsenborg

References

Citations
Svend Thorsen: De danske ministerier, vol. 1, Copenhagen, 1967.
Danish Manorhouses website - Boller
Danish Manorhouses website - Frijsenborg
Lex.dk - Dansk Biografisk Leksikon - C.E. Frijs

External links
 Danish Wikipedia on Christian Emil Krag-Juel-Vind-Frijs

1817 births
1896 deaths
Prime Ministers of Denmark
Foreign ministers of Denmark
Danish nobility
Members of the Folketing
Members of the Landsting (Denmark)
19th-century Danish politicians
Members of the Rigsrådet (1855-1866)
Krag family
Juel family
Friis family